Maria José Batista de Sales (born 19 March 1969), also known as Zezé, is a Brazilian former handball player. She competed in the women's tournament at the 2000 Summer Olympics.

References

External links
 

1969 births
Living people
Brazilian female handball players
Olympic handball players of Brazil
Handball players at the 2000 Summer Olympics
People from São Gonçalo, Rio de Janeiro
Sportspeople from Rio de Janeiro (state)
Pan American Games medalists in handball
Pan American Games gold medalists for Brazil
Pan American Games bronze medalists for Brazil
Handball players at the 1999 Pan American Games
Medalists at the 1995 Pan American Games
Medalists at the 1999 Pan American Games